Everglades City (formerly known as Everglades) is a city in Collier County, Florida, United States, of which it is the former county seat. As of the 2010 census, the population is 400. It is part of the Naples–Marco Island Metropolitan Statistical Area. The Gulf Coast Visitor Center for Everglades National Park is in Everglades City.

Geography

It is at the mouth of the Barron River, on Chokoloskee Bay. It is separated from the Gulf of Mexico by the northern end of the Ten Thousand Islands.

Climate

According to the Köppen climate classification, Everglades City has a tropical savanna climate (Aw).

Demographics

2020 census

As of the 2020 United States census, there were 352 people, 101 households, and 57 families residing in the city.

2000 census
As of the census of 2000, there were 479 people, 230 households, and 154 families residing in the city. The racial makeup of the city was 96.45% White, 0.84% African American, 0.63% Native American, 0.42% Asian, 1.46% from other races, and 0.21% from two or more races. Hispanic or Latino of any race were 3.97% of the population.

There were 230 households, out of which 13.9% had children under the age of 18 living with them, 60.0% were married couples living together, 3.0% had a female householder with no husband present, and 33.0% were non-families. Of all households, 27.0% were made up of individuals, and 9.1% had someone living alone who was 65 years of age or older. The average household size was 2.08 and the average family size was 2.50.

In the city, the population was spread out, with 11.9% under the age of 18, 4.2% from 18 to 24, 19.0% from 25 to 44, 30.5% from 45 to 64, and 34.4% who were 65 years of age or older. The median age was 25 years. For every 100 females, there were 104.7 males. For every 100 females age 18 and over, there were 111.0 males.

The median income for a household in the city was $36,667, and the median income for a family was $38,929. Males had a median income of $32,083 versus $22,222 for females. The per capita income for the city was $20,535. About 6.1% of families and 6.0% of the population were below the poverty line, including 9.5% of those under age 18 and 1.6% of those age 65 or older.

History

The area around Chokoloskee Bay, including the site of Everglades City, was occupied for thousands of years by Native Americans of the Glades culture, who were absorbed by the Calusa shortly before the arrival of Europeans in the New World, but by the time Florida was transferred from Spain to the United States in 1821, the area was uninhabited. A legend says that Seminoles planted potatoes along what is now the Barron River during the Seminole Wars, in the vicinity of the present Everglades City.

American settlement began after the Civil War, when Union sympathizers who had farmed on Cape Sable to supply Key West during the war moved up the west coast of the peninsula. The first permanent settler was William Smith Allen, who arrived on the banks of Potato Creek (later renamed the Allen River) in 1873. After Allen retired to Key West in 1889, George W. Storter, Jr. became the principal landowner in the area. Storter gained fame for his sugar cane crops. He opened a trading post in 1892, and gained a post office, called "Everglade", in 1895. Storter also began entertaining northern tourists who came to Everglade by yacht in the winter to hunt and fish. His house eventually grew into the Rod and Gun Club, visited by United States Presidents and other notables.

The first school in Everglade was organized in 1893. The school moved into a new building in 1895, but the building was destroyed by a tornado later in the year. The next school building was washed away by the 1910 hurricane. A Methodist circuit rider began visiting Everglade in 1888, and another Methodist minister began a four-year residency the next year. After that, Everglade was occasionally visited by itinerant preachers of various denominations. The Episcopal Church established a mission at Immokalee which eventually moved to Everglade when revitalized in the 1930s by Harriet Bedell.

In 1922 Barron Collier began buying large areas of land in what was then southern Lee County. In 1923 the Florida legislature created Collier County from Lee County, with the county seat at Everglade. The town was incorporated the same year as "Everglades" (adding the "s"). The town consisted of only a dozen families at the time, but some northern sportsmen had established winter homes there.

The Tamiami Trail, which crossed Collier's domain, passed five miles north of Everglades City. While construction was proceeding on the Trail (it was completed in 1929), Collier pushed construction of what became State Road 29 from Everglades City to Immokalee, providing the town with its first land connection to the rest of the state.  In 1928, the Atlantic Coast Line Railroad began service to Everglades City, which became the southernmost point the Coast Line ever reached. Service was provided by an extension of the Coast Line's Haines City Branch from Immokalee to Deep Lake, where it connected to Collier's Deep Lake Railroad, an earlier railroad that transported agricultural freight.  The railroad was removed in 1957.

In 1960 the strong winds and coastal flooding of Hurricane Donna combined to destroy 153 homes in Collier County, as well as inflict major damage on 409 more, and damage an additional 1,049. Everglades was hard hit, and two years later, Florida's legislature moved the county seat to East Naples, Florida. In 1965, the state legislature changed the town's name to Everglades City.

Historic buildings
Historic buildings in Everglades City include the Old Collier County Courthouse, Bank of Everglades Building, and Everglades Laundry (now the Museum of the Everglades).

Schools

 Becket School
 Everglades City School

Libraries
 Everglades City Branch Library

References

Further reading
 Carter, Luther J. (1974). The Florida Experience: Land and Water Policy in a Growth State. The Johns Hopkins University Press. .
 Leifermann, Henry. (1988). "Billiards and Redfish In the Everglades". The New York Times. March 13, 1988. Accessed July 5, 2013.
 Tebeau, Charlton W. (1955). The Story of the Chokoloskee Bay Country. University of Miami Press.

External links

 Community website
 Florida Backroads Travel

 
Cities in Collier County, Florida
Populated coastal places in Florida on the Gulf of Mexico
Cities in Florida
Former county seats in Florida
1892 establishments in Florida
Populated places established in 1892